The Black Sea Universities Network (BSUN) began in 1998 as part of the Organization of the Black Sea Economic Cooperation. The goal of this merger is the mutual exchange of experience in research and teaching and mutual recognition of qualifications, promotion of the mobility of teachers and students and the utilisation of international programmes to promote student exchanges. The organisation is based in Constanța in Romania (2018).
Pericles A. Mitkas has been President of BSUN since 2018. A current goal is to increase cooperation with the Balkan Universities Network.

Presidents 
 Adrian Bavaru Bucharest (1998-2000), Suha Sevük Ankara 2000-2002), Abel Maharramov Baku (2002-2004),  Ioan Bostan Chisinau (2004-2006), Stefan Barudov Varna (2006-2008), Mychailo Zgurovsky Ukraine (2008-2010), Dmitry Livanov Moscow (2010-2012), Jorgaq Kacani Tirana (2012-2014), Vladimir Bumbasirevic Belgrade (2014-2016) Giga Zedania Tbilisi (2016-2018), Pericles A. Mitkas Thessaloniki (2018-2020)

Member Universities

Albania 
 University of Tirana
 Polytechnic University of Tirana
 Ismail Qemal Vlora Technological University

Armenia 
 American University of Armenia
 National Polytechnic University of Armenia
 Yerevan State Medical University
 Yerevan Brusov State University of Languages and Social Sciences

Azerbaijan 
 Azerbaijan Medical University
 Azerbaijan State Academy Of Physical Education And Sport
 Azerbaijan State Pedagogical University
 Azerbaijan State Agricultural University
 Azerbaidjan Institute of Technology
 Azerbaijan State Oil and Industry University
 Azerbaijan State University of Culture and Arts
 Baku State University
 Baku Engineering University
 Baku Academy of Music
 Baku Higher Oil School
 Baku Academy of Music
 Baku Eurasian University
 Nakhchivan State University
 Western Caspian University
 Qafqaz University

Bulgaria 
 Assen-Slatarow-University Burgas
 Varna Free University 
 Shumen University
 Medical University of Varna
 Technical University of Varna
 University of National and World Economy
 Sofia University
 Veliko Tarnovo University

Georgia 
 Gori State Teaching University
 Tbilisi State University
 Georgian Technical University
 Ilia-Tschawtschawadse State Universität
 Tbilisi Public University Metekhi

Greece 
 Aristotle University of Thessaloniki
 National and Kapodistrian University of Athens
 Athens University of Economics and Business
 University of Macedonia
 University of Ioannina
 Democritus University of Thrace
 University of Thessaly
 University of Patras

Moldova 
 Comrat State University
 Technical University Moldova
 Moldova Akademy of Economics

Romania 
 Gheorghe Asachi Technical University of Iași
 Lucian Blaga University of Sibiu
 Ovidius University
 University of Bacău
 Andrei Saguna University
 Mircea cel Bătrân Naval Academy
 Maritime University
 University of Galați
 Oil & Gas University of Ploiești
 Politehnica University of Bucharest
 Spiru Haret University
 Technical University of Cluj-Napoca
 University of Agricultural Sciences and Veterinary Medicine of Cluj-Napoca

Russia 
 Kuban State University
 Kuban State Technological University
 National University of Science and Technology MISiS (Russia)
 South Russian State Polytechnical Institute
 Saratov State University
 Southern Federal University
 Astrakhan State University
 Peoples' Friendship University of Russia

Serbia 
 University of Belgrade

Turkey 
 Trakya University
 Dokuz Eylül University
 Galatasaray University
 Istanbul University
 Tekirdağ Namık Kemal University
 Fırat University
 Süleyman Demirel University
 Atatürk University
 Yozgat Bozok University
 Kırklareli University
 Çanakkale Onsekiz Mart University

Ukraine 
 Alfred Nobel University
 Cherkasy National University
 Dnipropetrovsk National University of Rail Transport
 Odessa National Academy of Food Technologies
 National University - Odessa National Maritime Academy
 K. D. Ushynsky South Ukrainian National Pedagogical University
 Poltava National Technical University
 Central Ukrainian Volodymyr Vynnychenko State Pedagogical University
 Prydniprovska State Academy of Civil Engineering and Architecture
 Ukrainian Academy of Banking of the National Bank of Ukraine
 National University of Kyiv-Mohyla Academy
 Kyiv National University of Trade and Economics
 Vinnytsia State Agrarian University
 Zaporizhia National Technical University
 Zhytomyr State Technological University
 Dnipropetrovsk State University of Internal Affairs
 National Mining University of Ukraine
 Kyiv National University of Technologies and Design
 National University of Food Technologies

References

External links 
 Offizielle Website of BSUN (englisch; russisch)
 Officielle Website of BSEC

College and university associations and consortia in Europe
International college and university associations and consortia